Willi Bars (13 February 1916 – January 2000) was a former German footballer.

He helped 1. FC Köln reach the top division a year after their foundation in the western second division. He also helped steer Köln to their first championship final in 1953.

1953 was also the final year in which he would play football professionally.

References

External links

1916 births
2000 deaths
German footballers
1. FC Köln players
Association football forwards